Elk Township is a township in Delaware County, Iowa, USA.  As of the 2000 census, its population was 626.

Geography
Elk Township covers an area of 36.31 square miles (94.05 square kilometers); of this, 0.01 square miles (0.02 square kilometers) or 0.02 percent is water. The streams of Fountain Springs Creek, Odell Branch and Schechtman Branch run through this township.

Cities and towns
 Greeley

Adjacent townships
 Elk Township, Clayton County (north)
 Mallory Township, Clayton County (northeast)
 Colony Township (east)
 Bremen Township (southeast)
 Oneida Township (south)
 Delaware Township (southwest)
 Honey Creek Township (west)
 Lodomillo Township, Clayton County (northwest)

Cemeteries
The township contains two cemeteries: Grant View and Saint Joseph's.

Major highways

References
Sources
 U.S. Board on Geographic Names (GNIS)
 United States Census Bureau cartographic boundary files
Notes

External links
 US-Counties.com
 City-Data.com

Townships in Delaware County, Iowa
Townships in Iowa